That Ghost of My Husband (Italian: Quel fantasma di mio marito) is a 1950 Italian comedy film directed by Camillo Mastrocinque and starring Walter Chiari, Enzo Biliotti and Jole Fierro. The film's sets were designed by the art director Angelo Zagame. It financed by the Sicilian producer Ferdinando Briguglio who had previously backed Luigi Zampa's Difficult Years. For many years it was considered a lost film before being rediscover in an attic and restored by the Cineteca di Bologna and  the National Museum of Cinema in Turin.

Cast
Walter Chiari	as Gianni
Medy Saint-Michel	as Vivia
Jole Fierro	as Maria
Enzo Biliotti as il senatore
Carlo Rizzo as  l'albergatore
Enrico Luzi as Slim, caporedattore del giornale
Ernesto Almirante as Villa, zio di Gianni
Agnese Dubbini as Fatima, la fattucchiera
Gianna Dauro as Madame Du Parc
Franco Coop as Kalif El Kabir, il califfo
Cesare Bettarini as  il direttore del giornale
Carlo Pedersoli as nuotatore in piscina che soccorre Vivia
 Leopoldo Valentini as il centralinista
 Marco Tulli as Arcangelo, l'autista
 Leo Garavaglia as  Achille Santi, il colonnello a riposo
 Katia Suffi as Ginetta

References

Bibliography
 Roberto Curti. Italian Gothic Horror Films, 1957-1969. McFarland, 2015.

External links
 

1950 films
1950s Italian-language films
Films directed by Camillo Mastrocinque
Italian comedy films
1950 comedy films
Italian black-and-white films
1950s Italian films